WNBY can refer to:

 WNBY (AM), a radio station (1450 AM) licensed to Newberry, Michigan, United States
 WNBY-FM, a radio station (93.9 FM) licensed to Newberry, Michigan, United States